Sylvia Shitsama Nyamweya (née Sylvia Shitsama), is a Kenyan  consultant neurosurgeon at the Kenyatta National Referral Hospital. She is the first female neurosurgeon in Kenya and one of a handful of female neurosurgeons in the country.

Background and education
She was born in Kenya in 1985, and attended Kenyan schools for her elementary and secondary education. She was admitted to the University of Nairobi, where she studied human medicine, graduating with a Bachelor of Medicine and Bachelor of Surgery (MBChB) degree. Later in October 2008, she was admitted into the neurosurgery residency program at Kenyatta National Hospital, operated by the University of Nairobi. The program, lasting at least six years, leads to the award of a Master of Medicine (MMed) degree in Neurosurgery. She graduated with her MMed degree in February 2015, and became the first female neurosurgeon in Kenya.

Work experience
Since her graduation from the MMed program, she was appointed as a consultant neurosurgeon at Kenyatta National Hospital, the largest referral hospital in the country, which also serves as the teaching hospital of the Nairobi Medical School. Effective January 2016, she concurrently serves as a lecturer at the College of Health Sciences at the Jomo Kenyatta University of Agriculture and Technology (JKUAT). In June 2017, she began to offer her services at Sage Brain and Spine Clinic, located at the Kenya Medical Association Centre in Nairobi. She is reported to be seeking funding to sponsor residents enrolled in the neurosurgery Master of Medicine programme to increase enrollment and output of specialist neurosurgeons.

Dr. Sylvia Shitsama has at some point served as a board member of the Kenya Medical Association Sacco (KMA), responsible for member credit issues.

Honors and awards
In 2017, she was named among the "Top 40 Women Under 40 in Kenya", by the Nation Media Group. In 2022, she was one of 14 people honored at the Grow, Unite, Build, Africa (GUBA) Awards, and received the Pioneer Award for Health Excellence.

See also
 Elizabeth Itotia
 Iddah Asin
 Carol Musyoka

References

External links

Progress of women in neurosurgery

Living people
1985 births
Kenyan neurosurgeons
Kenyan women surgeons
University of Nairobi alumni